AA-8 or AA8 may refer to:

 Molniya R-60, a Soviet lightweight air-to-air missile whose NATO reporting name is the AA-8 'Aphid'
 Gardiner's designated symbol for the hieroglyph for irrigation tunnels (Aa8)